Musée de Manega or Manega Museum is a museum located 55 km (34 mi) northwest of the city Ouagadougou, in the village of Manega, Burkina Faso. It was established by Frédéric Pacéré Titinga.

The museums contains the "Boura flutes," around 40 funeral pieces, tubes, terracota jars, bracelets and elements that were used for rituals in the Niger Valley, dating from the 2nd to the 11th century. It is also known for its 200-year-old Mossi rifles.

References

See also 
 List of museums in Burkina Faso

Museums in Burkina Faso
African art museums
Musical instrument museums
Music organisations based in Burkina Faso